The Colima Democratic Association (ADC) is a political party from the State of Colima, Mexico.

Carlos Vázquez Oldenbourg together with other politicians from Colima founded the ADC in 2002; the party was officially established in 2003 when it received its official registration as a political party from Colima.

On the 2003 Colima state election the ADC won a seat in the Congress of Colima; On the 2003 extraordinary election the ADC joined forces with the National Action Party (PAN) and the Party of the Democratic Revolution (PRD) in an unusual alliance between the PAN-PRD and the ADC named Alianza Todos por Colima supporting candidate Antonio Morales de la Peña who lost against Gustavo Vázquez Montes.

Political parties in Mexico
Democratic Association
Political parties established in 2003